Denise Lynn Rutkowski is a former American professional female bodybuilder.

Bodybuilding career
Her professional bodybuilding career was brief, and ended shortly after finishing 2nd in the Ms. Olympia contest in 1993. Her sudden retirement shocked the sport, as she was seen as an easy contender for the Ms. Olympia in 1994.

Contest history
 1988 NPC South Texas - 1st (MW)
 1988 NPC Spring City Classic - 1st (HW)
 1990 NPC Steel Rose - 1st
 1990 World Gym Classic - 1st
 1991 NPC Orange County Muscle Classic - 1st (HW & Overall)
 1991 NPC California State Championships - 1st (HW & Overall)
 1992 NPC Nationals - 3rd
 1993 NPC USA Championships - 1st (HW & Overall)
 1993 IFBB Jan Tana Classic - 1st
 1993 IFBB Ms. Olympia - 2nd

Personal life
During her bodybuilding career she arrived in San Diego, CA in 1989 from Texas and lived at Mission Beach while training at Gold's Gym Pacific Beach. She lived in San Diego until 1991, when she won the Orange County Muscle Classic and California State Championships, and thereafter moved to Venice, CA to train at Gold's Gym, Venice Beach, California, and had an interest in improving the quality of life for underprivileged children in the neighborhood. She spent time traveling with youth from Venice, California to WWF shows, Disneyland, and sporting events.

In 1994, she went back home to Fort Worth, Texas and she entered Calvary Cathedral International Bible College for two years. By 1996, Denise was going around the country spreading the word of God at various religious revivals. In 2001, Denise started training again, and returned to a better physical condition.

In 2012 and 2013, she was arrested for evading arrest in Tarrant County, Texas.

Television appearance

In 1994, she had a brief appearance on the show Dream On, in the episode Blinded by the Cheese.

References

1962 births
Living people
American female bodybuilders
American people of Polish descent
Professional bodybuilders
Sportspeople from Fort Worth, Texas
Sportspeople from Los Angeles
Sportspeople from Reading, Pennsylvania
Sportspeople from San Diego
21st-century American women